Endothenia oblongana is a moth of the family Tortricidae. It is found in the Palearctic realm.

The wingspan is 11–15 mm. The moth flies from May to August depending on the location.

The larvae feed on various herbaceous plants.

References

External links
 Microlepidoptera.nl 

Endotheniini
Moths of Europe
Moths described in 1811